The National Marine Science Centre (NMSC) is part of the School of Environment, Science and Engineering, at Southern Cross University. Located in Coffs Harbour, New South Wales, on the east coast of Australia and adjacent to the Solitary Islands Marine Park.

Science
Undergraduate and graduate courses are offered by Southern Cross University. 
Bachelor of Marine Science and Management
Bachelor of Environmental Science/Bachelor of Marine Science and Management
Bachelor of Science with Honours
Master of Marine Science and Management

Research is undertaken by resident scientific staff. Principal areas are:-
Biodiversity of marine and estuarine habitats
Patterns and biological processes in marine communities
Human induced impacts on marine systems
Fisheries and marine park management
Marine resource economics and management
Values in the marine economy
Capacity development of marine scientists and managers

History
The Centre was opened on 15 November 2001 by John Anderson MP, Deputy Prime Minister of Australia. Originally a collaboration between the University of New England and Southern Cross University, it took its first students in 2002. The centre was funded from the Government of Australia's Centenary of Federation Fund. The Centre became solely managed through Southern Cross University in 2010.

The Centre is sited within the grounds of the Novotel Pacific Bay Resort, a few kilometers north of Coffs Harbour. The building was at one time the resort's sports centre, gymnasium, squash courts, and alfresco restaurant.

See also
Earth science (Hydrosphere)
Oceanography 
List of universities in Australia

References

External links

Earth sciences
Southern Cross University